Caio is a Portuguese masculine given name derived from the Latin name Gaius. People with that name include:

 Caio (footballer, born 1999), Brazilian footballer
 Caio Fernando Abreu (1948–1996), Brazilian writer
 Caio Alves (born 1986), Brazilian footballer
 Caio Blat (born 1980), Brazilian actor
 Caio Blinder (born 1957), Brazilian journalist
 Caio Bonfim (born 1991), Brazilian racewalker
 Caio Castro (born 1989), Brazilian actor
 Caio César (1988–2015), Brazilian voice actor
 Caio Collet (born 2002), Brazilian racing driver
 Caio Canedo Corrêa (born 1990), Brazilian footballer
 Caio De Cenco (born 1989), Italian footballer
 Caio Lucas Fernandes (born 1994), Brazilian footballer
 Caio Fonseca (born 1959), American painter
 Caio Domenico Gallo (1697–1780), Italian historian
 Caio Japa (born 1983), Brazilian futsal player
 Caio Júnior (1965–2016), Brazilian football manager
 Caio Koch-Weser (born 1944), German politician
 Caio Magalhães (born 1987), Brazilian mixed martial artist
 Caio Vianna Martins (1923–1938), Brazilian scout
 Caio Mendes (born 1986), Brazilian footballer
 Caio Pizzoli, Brazilian ten-pin bowler
 Caio Prado Júnior (1907–1990), Brazilian historian
 Caio Rangel (born 1996), Brazilian footballer
 Caio Ribeiro (born 1975), Brazilian footballer
 Caio Henrique Siqueira Sanchez (born 1993), Brazilian footballer
 Caio Secco (born 1990), Brazilian footballer
 Antônio Caio da Silva Sousa (born 1980), Brazilian footballer
 Caio Souza (born 1993), Brazilian artistic gymnast
 Caio Terra (born 1986), Brazilian  jiu-jitsu practitioner
 Caio Torres (born 1987), Brazilian basketball player
 Caio Danilo Laursen Tuponi (born 1992), Brazilian footballer
 Caio Zampieri (born 1986), Brazilian tennis player
 Wolnei Caio (born 1968), Brazilian footballer

See also
 Caio (disambiguation)
 Caius (disambiguation)
 Gaius

Portuguese masculine given names